Metzler Orgelbau, a firm of organ builders founded in 1890 and based since 1933 in Dietikon, near Zurich in Switzerland, is one of the most important makers of the European classical organ revival and has built many important and respected instruments throughout Europe. Its instruments include:

 Belgium 
The east-end organ at Antwerp Cathedral
 Spain
The main organ of the Abbey of Poblet

 Switzerland
The organ of the Grossmünster, Zurich
The organ of the Jesuit Church in Lucerne
The church of St Nikolaus, Bremgarten
The organ of St. Peter and St. Paul Church, Villmergen (on which Elena Barshai recorded Bach's Goldberg Variations for Brilliant Classics in autumn 2007). 
 United Kingdom 
 The chapel of Trinity College, Cambridge (1975)
 University Church of St Mary the Virgin, Oxford (1986).

References

External links 

Official website: http://www.metzler-orgelbau.ch/htm/EN/index.htm

Musical instrument manufacturing companies of Switzerland
Pipe organ building companies
Companies based in the canton of Zürich